Love Supreme or A Love Supreme may refer to:

Music
Love Supreme festival, a jazz festival in the UK promoted by Jazz FM

Albums
A Love Supreme, a 1965 album by John Coltrane
A Love Supreme: Live in Seattle, a 1965 recording by John Coltrane released in 2021
A Love Supreme (Chanté Moore album)
Love Supreme (The Supremes album), a 1988 compilation album by Diana Ross & the Supremes

Songs
"A Love Supreme", song by Will Downing 1988
"Love Supreme", song by Flower Kings from Instant Delivery
"Love Supreme", song by JS16
"Love Supreme", song by Nao from Saturn

Other
 "A Love Supreme" (Dollhouse), an episode of Dollhouse
 A Love Supreme (fanzine), a fanzine for supporters of Sunderland A.F.C.